Bendalong (Bendy) is a small town situated on the South Coast of New South Wales. It is located in the region of Ulladulla, in the City of Shoalhaven.

References

City of Shoalhaven
Towns in New South Wales
Towns in the South Coast (New South Wales)
Coastal towns in New South Wales